Ian Gabriel is a South African film and commercials director based in Cape Town, South Africa. 

He directed the film Forgiveness starring Arnold Vosloo, which treats the theme of forgiveness in post-apartheid South Africa. His 2013 film Four Corners was selected as the South African entry for Best Foreign Language Film at the 86th Academy Awards.

Filmography 

 Slash (2002) (Producer Only)
 Forgiveness (2004)
 Four Corners (2013)
 Liting Nick (2016) (short)
 Anne Frank and Me (TBA)

References

External links 

South African film directors
Living people
Year of birth missing (living people)